Love & Secret is a 2014 South Korean daily drama starring Shin So-yul and Kim Heung-soo. It aired on KBS2 from November 11, 2014 to April 3, 2015 on Mondays to Fridays at 19:50 for 102 episodes.

Plot
Han Ah-reum, the daughter of the Korean Vice-Minister for Culture, returns home with a child born out of wedlock, a fact that will shame her family and ruin the chances of her father becoming the Minister for Culture. Chun Sung-woon, heir of the Winner fashion and clothing company, is being backed into an arranged marriage that he does not want. When the paths of the two cross and re-cross, initial hostility turns into love. However, the secret of Ah-reum's illegitimate daughter may become a barrier to true love.

Cast

Main characters
 Shin So-yul as Han Ah-reum
Fashion student who becomes pregnant with Phillip's daughter Tiffany, but is abandoned by him, becomes a single mother despite the stigma that it brings. She becomes a designer at Winner's in order to provide for her daughter, where she meets and falls in love with Cheon Sung-woon.
 Kim Heung-soo as Cheon Sung-woon
Director of the Winner's Group, falls in love with Ah-reum and breaks off an arranged marriage with Go Yoon-yi, persists in wanting to marry Ah-reum even after it is discovered that she is a single mother
 Yang Jin-woo as Phillip Choi
Hedge fund manager, abandons Ah-reum for a financially more lucrative marriage but seeks a divorce from his wife once he has extracted what he wants from it,  when Ah-reum rejects him becomes obsessed with winning back Ah-reum and taking custody of Tiffany, uses Winner's need for expansion capital to manipulate Sung-woon and Ah-reum
 Yeon Min-ji as Go Yoon-yi
Corporate lawyer, and Sung-woon's friend since childhood, from an impoverished background Sung-woon's family paid for her education with the intention of marrying her to him, when Sung-woon breaks off their engagement she helps Phillip and betrays Winner's in order to drive Sung-woon and Ah-reum apart

Supporting characters
Han family
 Jung Dong-hwan as Han Pan-suk
Ah-reum's father, vice-minister of culture, candidate to become minister, ruins his career and a reputation for probity in order to protect Ah-reum
 Kim Hye-ok as Oh Myung-hwa
Ah-reum's mother, housewife, suffers early onset dementia which Phillip uses to snatch Tiffany and paint Ah-reum as an unfit mother
 Son Seung-won as Han Jin-woo
Ah-reum's younger brother, a medical student and talented singer
 Park Joon-myun as Oh Sun-hwa
 Choi Seung-kyung as Kwon Young-soo
 Yang Han-yeol as Kwon Hyuk-min

Chun family
 Kim Eung-soo as Chun Do-hyung
 Hwang In-young as Lee Soo-ah
 Heo Jin as Lee Hae-bang
 Jo Hyun-do as Chun Sung-ho

Extended cast
 Jo Hyun-sik as Secretary Jang
 Im Baek-chun as Kim Sung-chul
 Yoo Hee-do as Woo Sang-joon
 Son Se-bin as Heo Anna

Ratings
The blue numbers represent the lowest ratings and the red numbers represent the highest ratings
NR denotes that the drama did not rank in the top 20 daily programs on that date

Awards and nominations

International broadcast 
The series aired, one week after initial broadcast, on KBS World with subtitles.

References

External links
  
 
 

2014 South Korean television series debuts
2015 South Korean television series endings
Korean Broadcasting System television dramas
Korean-language television shows
South Korean romance television series
Television series by IWill Media